The County Fair is a 1912 American short silent drama film starring Earle Foxe and Alice Joyce who had acted together earlier in the year in The Street Singer. It was the second film of Earle Foxe.

Cast
Alice Joyce as Mary
Earle Foxe as John
Hazel Neason as Lazelle	
James B. Ross as Jim Burke	
William R. McKay as Amasa Terry	
Miriam Lawrence as Sally Terry

External links

1912 films
1912 drama films
Silent American drama films
American silent short films
American black-and-white films
Kalem Company films
1912 short films
1910s American films